The Dance may refer to:

Art 
 The Dance (Picasso), a painting by Picasso
 The Dance II, a 1932 mural by Henri Matisse
 Dance (Matisse), a 1910 painting by Henri Matisse

Music 
 The Dance (Fleetwood Mac album) (1997)
 The Dance (Dave Koz album) (1999)
 The Dance (Faithless album) (2010)
 The Dance (EP), an EP by Within Temptation
 "The Dance" (song), a song by Garth Brooks
 "The Dance", three songs by Laraaji from Day of Radiance
 "The Dance", a song by the Music from The Music

Other uses
 The Dance (1998 film), Icelandic film
 The Dance (1959 film)
 The Dance (1962 film)

See also 
 Dance (disambiguation)
 La Danse (disambiguation)
 La Dance (disambiguation)